Sugar Hill Records is an American bluegrass and Americana record label.

It was founded in Durham, North Carolina in 1978 by Barry Poss and David Freeman, the owner of County Records and Rebel Records.  Poss acquired full control of Sugar Hill in 1980 and owned the label until 1998, when he sold it to the Welk Music Group, owner of Vanguard Records. Poss stayed on as president, and in 2002 was promoted to chairman. Sugar Hill remained in Durham until 2007, when Poss moved the label to Nashville, Tennessee.

Among the many notable artists who have released albums on the label are Nickel Creek, Doc Watson, Townes Van Zandt, Ricky Skaggs, Guy Clark, Robert Earl Keen, Sam Bush and Dolly Parton. One of Parton's albums for Sugar Hill, Halos & Horns (2002), included a song called "Sugar Hill", which she wrote as a tribute to the label. In 2008, Welk Music Group appointed EMI as distributor of its labels including Sugar Hill.

In 2006, Sugar Hill executive Barry Poss won a Lifetime Achievement Award from the Americana Music Association.

The label was acquired by Concord Bicycle Music in April 2015.

It is not related to the hip hop label of the same name.

Grammy Awards for Best Bluegrass Album
1992 – Spring Training, Carl Jackson and John Starling
1994 – Waitin' for the Hard Times to Go, Nashville Bluegrass Band
1995 – The Great Dobro Sessions, Jerry Douglas and Tut Taylor (producers)
1996 – Unleashed, Nashville Bluegrass Band
1997 – True Life Blues: The Songs of Bill Monroe, Todd Phillips (producer)
2001 – The Grass Is Blue, Dolly Parton, Steve Buckingham (producer) and Gary Paczosa (engineer/mixer); Parton's first release on the label
2006 – The Company We Keep, Del McCoury Band

Other Grammys
 2002 – "Shine", from Little Sparrow, Dolly Parton, Best Female Country Vocal Performance
 2003 – This Side, Nickel Creek, Alison Krauss (producer), and Gary Paczosa (engineer/mixer), Best Contemporary Folk Album
 2006 – Fiddler's Green, Tim O'Brien, Best Traditional Folk Album
 2007 – "Whiskey Before Breakfast", from Not Too Far from the Tree, Bryan Sutton and Doc Watson, Best Country Instrumental Performance
 2010 – "Hummingbyrd" from Ghost Train: The Studio B Sessions, Marty Stuart, Best Country Instrumental Performance

Roster

 Terry Allen
 Acoustic Syndicate
 Pat Alger
 Mike Auldridge
 Austin Lounge Lizards
 Bad Livers
 Riley Baugus
 Black Prairie
 Byron Berline
 Alan Bibey
 Blue Rose
 Boone Creek
 Sarah Borges
 Ronnie Bowman
 John C. Reilly
 Brother Boys
 Clarence "Gatemouth" Brown
 Sam Bush
 BlueRidge
 California
 Chesapeake
 Guy Clark
 Dudley Connell
 Country Gentlemen
 John Cowan
 Dan Crary
 Mike Cross
 Rodney Crowell
 The Deep Dark Woods
 Grey DeLisle
 Don Dixon
 Donna the Buffalo
 Jerry Douglas
 Casey Driessen
 John Duffey
 The Duhks
 Jonathan Edwards
 Sara Evans
 Jeff Bridges
 Cathy Fink
 Front Range
 The Gibson Brothers
 Good Ol' Persons
 The Gourds
 Pat Green
 The Greencards
 David Grisman
 Aubrey Haynie
 Chris Hillman
 Hot Rize
 Randy Howard
 Walter Hyatt
 Infamous Stringdusters
 Carl Jackson
 Wanda Jackson
 Sarah Jarosz
 Jewel
 Joey + Rory
 Marti Jones
 Kathy Kallick
 Robert Earl Keen
 King Mackerel
 Kukuruza
 Barbara Lamb
 Sonny Landreth
 Grey Larsen
 Laurel Canyon Ramblers
 Doyle Lawson & Quicksilver
 Albert Lee
 Lonesome River Band
 Lonesome Standard Time
 Mike Marshall & Chris Thile
 Kathy Mattea
 Del McCoury Band
 James McMurtry
 Metamora
 Scott Miller
 Jim Mills
 Moe
 Allison Moorer
 Jimmy Murphy
 Mutual Admiration Society
 Nashville Bluegrass Band
 Bobbie Nelson
 Willie Nelson
 Tara Nevins
 New Grass Revival
 Nickel Creek
 Mollie O'Brien
 Tim O'Brien
 Maura O'Connell
 Osborne Brothers
 David Parmley
 Dolly Parton
 Tom Paxton
 Johnny Paycheck
 Herb Pedersen
 Positive Force
 Dirk Powell
 Psychograss
 Railroad Earth
 Ranch Romance
 Reckless Kelly
 Red Clay Ramblers
 Red Stick Ramblers
 Lou Reid
 Tony Rice
 Don Rigsby
 Peter Rowan
 Kevin Russell's Junker
 Martha Scanlan
 Darrell Scott
 Seldom Scene
 Sammy Shelor
 Ricky Skaggs
 Connie Smith
 Corey Smith
 Kenny Smith
 John Starling
 Marty Stuart
 Bryan Sutton
 Sweethearts of the Rodeo
 Chris Thile
 Trapezoid
 Greg Trooper
 Uncle Kracker
 Uncle Walt's Band
 Sally Van Meter
 Townes Van Zandt
 Sean Watkins
 Doc Watson
 Merle Watson
 Don Williams
 Brian Wright
 Lee Ann Womack (Former, transferred to ATO Records)

See also
List of record labels
 Welk Music Group
 Ranwood Records
 Vanguard Records
1978 in music
1998 in music

References

External links
Official website

Record labels established in 1978
Folk record labels
American country music record labels
Music of North Carolina
Bluegrass record labels
Companies based in Durham, North Carolina
American independent record labels